Jeremy Dudziak (born 28 August 1995) is a professional footballer who plays as a midfielder for Turkish club Hatayspor, on loan from 2. Bundesliga club Greuther Fürth. A former youth international for Germany, Dudziak has represented the Tunisia national team.

Club career
Dudziak attended MSV Duisburg's youth academy and later, as a 16-year-old, joined Borussia Dortmund's academy. He made his debut for Borussia Dortmund II against Karlsruher SC on 16 February 2013, coming as an 86th-minute substitute for Mustafa Amini. In the 2013–14 U19 Bundesliga, he played eight times, scoring six goals. This included two braces against Schalke 04 U19, VfL Theesen U19 beside two more goals against the under-19 sides of 1. FC Köln and Wuppertaler SV. With the reserves in the 3. Liga, Dudziak played 12 times in the same season.

On 13 January 2015, Dudziak played a friendly match for Borussia Dortmund against Swiss side FC Sion, where he started the match, being substituted for Tammo Harder in the sixty-first minute. He also played four more friendlies for the club against Dutch club FC Utrecht, twice against Fortuna Düsseldorf, and Hessen Kassel.

On 27 January, Dudziak signed a professional contract with Borussia Dortmund up until 30 June 2018. On 4 March, he was an unused substitute in a DFB-Pokal match against Dynamo Dresden. He made his debut in a 3–2 away win against Hannover 96 on 21 March 2015,  coming on as a 58th-minute substitute for Oliver Kirch.

On 28 August, Dudziak signed a three-year contract with FC St. Pauli.

In January 2023, he joined Hatayspor on loan until the end of the season from Greuther Fürth.

International career
Dudziak was born in Germany to a Ghanaian father who was raised in Tunisia and a German mother; thus qualified to play for Ghana, Tunisia and Germany. Dudziak made his debut for Germany under-16 against Russia U16. He won the 2014 UEFA European Under-19 Championship with the Germany under-19 team.

Dudziak debuted for the Tunisia national team in a 1–0 friendly win over Mauritania on 6 September 2019.

Career statistics

Club

Honours
Germany U19
UEFA European Under-19 Championship: 2014

References

External links

Kicker profile 
Bundesliga profile

1995 births
Living people
Association football defenders
Footballers from North Rhine-Westphalia
Tunisian footballers
Tunisia international footballers
German footballers
Germany youth international footballers
Germany under-21 international footballers
German people of Tunisian descent
German sportspeople of Ghanaian descent
Tunisian people of Ghanaian descent
Tunisian people of European descent
Citizens of Tunisia through descent
Borussia Dortmund II players
Borussia Dortmund players
FC St. Pauli players
Hamburger SV players
SpVgg Greuther Fürth players
Hatayspor footballers
3. Liga players
2. Bundesliga players
Bundesliga players
Süper Lig players
German expatriate footballers
Tunisian expatriate footballers
Expatriate footballers in Turkey
German expatriate sportspeople in Turkey
Tunisian expatriate sportspeople in Turkey